The 1895 Tennessee Docs football team represented the Tennessee Medical Unit at Knoxville (now known as the University of Tennessee College of Medicine in Memphis, Tennessee) in college football during the 1895 college football season. The Docs finished the season with a winless record of 0–3–1.

Schedule

References

Tennessee Docs
Tennessee Docs football seasons
College football winless seasons
Tennessee Docs football